La zia smemorata (i.e. "The Amnesiac Aunt") is a 1940 Italian "white-telephones" comedy film directed by Ladislao Vajda and starring Dina Galli.

Plot  
Jealous of his girlfriend, the lawyer Alberto Moretti is convinced that she spent a couple of days in a high mountain refuge in the company of the engineer Paolo Ravelli, a friend of the lawyer. However, it is only a misunderstanding and therefore, to clarify his position and restore the truth, the engineer proposes to his friend and his girlfriend to find the girl who in the shelter had passed herself off as the lawyer's girlfriend. However, an intrusive and bizarre aunt joins the party who, by meddling in everything, causes further misunderstandings and misunderstandings to no end. However, the group manages to discover that the mysterious girl was not the lawyer's girlfriend at all. The two slandered youths managed to re-establish the truth but, by dating, they also fell in love with each other. So in the end, it is also the lawyer, jealous and suspicious, who suffers the damage.

Cast 

Dina Galli as Aunt Giulia
 Alanova as Clara
Nelly Corradi as   Maria Giusti
Osvaldo Valenti as   Paolo Rovelli
Carlo Campanini as  Alberto Moretti
Umberto Sacripante as  Professor Mannelli
Claudio Ermelli as   Taddeo 
Guido Notari as  The Police Commissioner
 Luigi Erminio D'Olivo as The Secretary
Renato Malavasi as  The Porter
Giulio Battiferri as The Waiter
 Pina Piovani as   Clara's Maid

References

External links

1940 comedy films
1940 films
Italian comedy films
Films directed by Ladislao Vajda
Italian black-and-white films
1940s Italian-language films
1940s Italian films